U.S. Highway 18 (US 18) is the northernmost east–west U.S. Highway in the state of Iowa.  As with all state highways in Iowa, it is maintained by the Iowa Department of Transportation (Iowa DOT).  It enters the state by crossing the Big Sioux River between Inwood and Canton, South Dakota.  It travels  and connects Spencer, Mason City and Charles City.  The highway leaves the state via the Marquette–Joliet Bridge over the Mississippi River at Marquette.  Prior to becoming a U.S. Highway, the route US 18 follows was known as Primary Road No. 19 and the National Parks Pike.

Route description
It runs easterly through rural Lyon County, in the northwestern corner of the state. At Inwood it meets Iowa 182, which provides access to Sioux Falls, South Dakota, via Iowa 9 and South Dakota Highway 42. US 18 turns south at Inwood and heads into Sioux County. The highway crosses the Rock River on its way towards Rock Valley and Hull. West of Hull, at Perkins, US 18 juts to the south along US 75 before turning east again closer to Hull. The highway continues east towards Sheldon.

As it crosses into O'Brien County on the western edge of Sheldon, US 18 intersects the business loop of Iowa 60. The two routes head east towards a diamond interchange with Iowa 60 on the eastern side of town where the business loop ends. The highway roughly parallels the Dakota, Minnesota and Eastern Railroad (DM&E Railroad). In Sanborn, US 18 is briefly overlapped by US 59, which joins from the north and leaves to the south. Continuing east, it passes through Hartley and then enters Clay County.  North of Spencer, it intersects US 71 and the two routes head south together through town.  On the south side of Spencer, the two routes come to a T intersection and each route heads in the opposite direction – US 18 to the east and US 71 to the west.

East of Spencer, US 18 passes through Ruthven in Palo Alto County. Between Ruthven and Emmetsburg, it is joined by Iowa 4 from the north. The two routes split again in Emmetsburg as Iowa 4 heads south. US 18 continues east, briefly heading south to enter Cylinder. The route curves back to the east at the DM&E Railroad line. An intersection with Iowa 15 near Whittemore marks the Palo Alto–Kossuth county line. Iowa 15 follows US 18 for  before it splits away to the north. On the northern edge of Algona, the highway meets US 169. At the eastern county line, shared with Hancock County, is an intersection with Iowa 17, which marks that route's northern end.

East of Garner, the route takes a north-northeasterly path as it goes through Ventura and skirts the northern shore of Clear Lake. Near the northeastern shore of the lake, it enters the city of Clear Lake, where it meets Interstate 35 (I-35). Iowa 122 and U.S. Route 18 Business (US 18 Bus.) head east from the interchange with the interstate. Iowa 27, the Avenue of the Saints highway, which had hitherto followed I-35 southbound now follows US 18 eastbound. The two routes, now on a four-lane, controlled-access highway, follow a path which passes to the south of Mason City. They meet US 65 and US 18 Bus. at exit 186.

At the Floyd county line, US-18; and Iowa 27 become a limited-access road and angle slightly to the northeast, passing Rudd. At Floyd, the two routes are joined by US 218. The three routes head south along a bypass of Charles City. They intersect Iowa 14 on the western side of town and take a 90-degree curve to the east.  At exit 218 of the expressway, US 18 leaves US 218 and Iowa 27, which continue southeastward towards Cedar Falls–Waterloo. US 18 briefly heads north into Charles City with US 218 Bus. The two routes meet the northern end of Iowa 14, and US 18 splits away to the east to cross the Cedar River.

Heading east again, the route enters Chickasaw County and passes through Bassett on its way to New Hampton. It meets US 63 at a four-lane bypass on the western side of town. The route turns to travel due-east through Fredericksburg.

Continuing due-east, US 18 does not enter another community for  until it reaches West Union in Fayette County. In West Union, it intersects Iowa 150. East of town, it crosses into the Driftless Area, an area that was untouched by glaciation during the last ice age. The route turns to the northeast to through Clermont and then to the north to meet US 52 at Postville in southern Allamakee County.  The two routes head east through Postville and turn south into Clayton County. Near Froelich, US 52 leaves to the south towards Dubuque. Heading to the northeast towards, McGregor and Marquette, its business loop goes through the towns while the mainline skirts around them.  The business loop rejoins the mainline at the foot of the Marquette–Joliet Bridge, which spans the Mississippi River.  US 18 continues east into Wisconsin with Wisconsin Highway 60, which begins at the state line.

History
Before it and the rest of the U.S. Highway System were designated on November 11, 1926, US 18 was known by two names in the state. It was first known as Primary Road No. 19, which was assigned to the route when the Iowa State Highway Commission published its first state highway map in 1919. The route was also called the National Parks Pike, which began at Yellowstone National Park and ended in Madison, Wisconsin, encompassing all of Primary Road No. 19 in the state. The National Parks Pike name fell into disuse after the highway became US 18.

By 1927, a significant portion of the route was paved, while the remainder was gravelled. In seven years, the gap between O'Brien County and Algona was finished which created  of continuous pavement. During those same seven years, the route from West Union to the Mississippi River and all of Primary Road No. 59, which included the  overlap of US 18 near New Hampton were paved. Primary Road No. 59 is now known as US 63. By the start of World War II, the only remaining section of US 18 that wasn't paved was an  section west of Rock Valley in Sioux County. That last section would not be completed for another ten years.

Prior to 1932, the only way vehicles traveling US 18 could cross the Mississippi River was by ferry. That changed in when identical suspension bridges were built to cross the river between Marquette and Prairie du Chien, Wisconsin. The first car to cross the bridges did so on March 7, 1932. Users of the bridge had to pay a toll until July 15, 1954. The bridges remained in use for another twenty years, when they were replaced by the Marquette–Joliet Bridge. In 1988–89, a bypass was built around McGregor so US 18 could connect directly to the Marquette–Joliet Bridge. A short road had previously provided access to and from the bridge. The old alignment of the route became US 18 Bus.

Over the late-1990s, construction began on the Avenue of the Saints corridor near Mason City.  A new controlled-access facility was built south of the city east to Rudd.  On December 5, 1999, this section of freeway opened and US 18 was realigned onto the new road.  The old alignment became Iowa Highway 122.  By the end of the next year, the four-lane expressway was extended to Charles City.  By 2003, an expressway carrying US 63 was built around New Hampton.  US 18 was rerouted onto the expressway and the western end of Iowa 24 was moved to the US 63 / US 18 interchange.

Major intersections

See also
Special routes of U.S. Route 18

References

External links

The Iowa Highways Page by Jason Hancock
Twin Suspension Bridges Historic photos of the former river crossing at Marquette by John A. Weeks

 Iowa
18
Transportation in Lyon County, Iowa
Transportation in Sioux County, Iowa
Transportation in O'Brien County, Iowa
Transportation in Clay County, Iowa
Transportation in Palo Alto County, Iowa
Transportation in Kossuth County, Iowa
Transportation in Hancock County, Iowa
Transportation in Cerro Gordo County, Iowa
Transportation in Floyd County, Iowa
Transportation in Chickasaw County, Iowa
Transportation in Fayette County, Iowa
Transportation in Clayton County, Iowa
Transportation in Allamakee County, Iowa